was a Japanese film studio active in the early years of cinema in Japan.

Background
M. Pathe was founded in 1906 by Shōkichi Umeya, a businessman who had distributed films first in Malaysia and Singapore and then in Japan. He took the name "M. Pathe" from the French Pathé Frères studio even though his company had no official connection with that. Umeya built a studio in Ōkubo near Shinjuku, Tokyo, and released films such as ones featuring the girls Kabuki of Nakamura Kasen.

An ambitious man, Umeya sent cameramen to Antarctica to record Nobu Shirase's expedition, and thus create one of Japan's first feature-length documentaries. He put on a high-class show, with pretty usherettes and high ticket prices, while also using his money to help fund Sun Yat-sen and the Chinese Revolution.

Merger
It was under Umeya's instigation that Yoshizawa Shōten, Yokota Shōkai, and Fukuhōdō merged with M. Pathe to form Nikkatsu in 1912. His plan was to sever himself from M. Pathe's difficult financial straits by creating a trust that emulated the Motion Picture Patents Company.

References

Japanese film studios